Chiquimula is one of the 22 departments of Guatemala, in Central America. The departmental capital is also called Chiquimula. The department was established by decree in 1871, and forms a part of the northeastern region of Guatemala. Physically, it is mountainous, with a climate that varies between tropical and temperate, depending on the location.

History
At the time of Spanish contact, Chiquimula was part of the indigenous kingdom of Chiquimulha, or Payaqui, governed from its capital at Copanti (now Copan, in Honduras). This kingdom also included portions of Honduras and El Salvador. The name Chiquimula is derived from the Nahuatl chiquimoltlān, from chiquimolin meaning "finches" with the locative suffix -tlān, to mean "place of many finches".

Chiquimula de la Sierra ("Chiquimula in the Highlands"), occupying the area of the modern department, was inhabited by Ch'orti' Maya at the time of the conquest. The first Spanish reconnaissance of this region took place in 1524 by an expedition that included Hernando de Chávez, Juan Durán, Bartolomé Becerra and Cristóbal Salvatierra, amongst others. In 1526 three Spanish captains, Juan Pérez Dardón, Sancho de Barahona and Bartolomé Becerra, invaded Chiquimula on the orders of Pedro de Alvarado. The indigenous population soon rebelled against excessive Spanish demands, but the rebellion was quickly put down in April 1530. However, the region was not considered fully conquered until a campaign by Jorge de Bocanegra in 1531–1532 that also took in parts of Jalapa. The afflictions of Old World diseases, war and overwork in the mines and encomiendas took a heavy toll on the inhabitants of eastern Guatemala, to the extent that indigenous population levels never recovered to their pre-conquest levels.

The modern department was created by executive decree on 10 November 1871. The decree reduced the area covered by the administrative division of Chiquimula by removing that portion that now forms the modern department of Zacapa and part of the department of Izabal.

Geography
Chiquimula is located in the northeastern region of Guatemala. It is bordered by the department of Zacapa to the north and the departments of Jalapa and Zacapa to the west. To the south, Chiqimula is bordered by the department of Jutiapa and the republic of El Salvador. To the east, the department is bordered by the republic of Honduras.

Mountains cross the department from north to south, crossing from the border with Jalapa and joining the Sierra del Merendón range, which extends into neighbouring Honduras and El Salvador. Chiquimula possesses two drainage basins, one flowing towards the Atlantic Ocean, the other towards the Pacific Ocean. The principal river in the department is the Río Grande, or Camotán River, which flows in from Honduras, before becoming the Jocotán River, and flowing into the Motagua River to eventually drain into the Caribbean Sea. In the south of the department, the most important rivers are the Anguiatú and the Ostúa.

The department has numerous mineral deposits, and silver has been mined there since the Spanish colonial period.

Climate
Chiquimula is divided into two climatic zones; the municipalities of Concepción Las Minas, Esquipulas, Ipala, Olopa and Quetzaltepeque are temperate, while Camotán, Chiquimula, Jocotán, San Jacinto, San José La Arada and San Juan Ermita are tropical. Climate change has notably affected the department, with maximum temperatures reaching , and a decrease in rainfall contributing to scarcity of foodstuffs.

Population
At the 2018 census, the population of Chiquimula was 415,063. In 2002, 83.33% of the population was non-indigenous and 16.67% was indigenous. The majority of the indigenous population are Ch'orti' Maya, with a very small number of Xinka and Garifuna. In 2006, 59.5% of the population of the department was living in poverty, with 27.7% of the population living in extreme poverty (included within the former percentage). Poverty levels tend to be higher in the northern portions of the department, and lower in the south. In 2002, the department of Chiquimula contained 2.7% of the national population, with a population density of 127 per square kilometre (329 per square mile), ranking it 10th of 22 departments for population density. In 2013, 25.5% of the population were recorded as illiterate, demonstrating a year-on-year reduction in illiteracy rates over the previous five years.

In 2002, 26% of the population of the department lived in urban areas, and 74% in rural areas. There were an average of 5.1 people per household; averaging 4.5 people per household in urban areas and rising to an average of 5.3 people per household in rural areas.

Ethnicity and language
Breakdown of population by ethnicity for the whole departmental population, and first language in those aged three and above, as recorded in the 2002 census.

Mortality
In 2013, 2095 deaths were registered in the department, demonstrating a 1% drop on the previous year, and 2.9% of the national total:

Governance

As with all Guatemalan departments, the regional government is headed by a governor appointed directly by the president of Guatemala.

Municipalities 
Since its establishment as a department in the late 19th century, Chiquimula has been divided into eleven municipalities.

Economy
Principle products of the department of Chiquimula are cattle, rice, maize, beans, potato, coffee, cacao, peanuts and tropical fruits, ceramics, rope, leather and palm products. Palm handicrafts include the manufacture of a variety of baskets for different purposes.

Tourism

Esquipulas is one of the most important centres for religious pilgrimage in Central America, focused upon the Black Christ of Esquipulas contained in the basilica church, which has been venerated due to miracles attributed to the image.

Notes

References

Aguirre Barrera, Miriam Judith (2009). "La Necesidad De Desconcentrar la Administración Pública Centralizada en las Gobernaciones Departamentales en Guatemala" (in Spanish). Guatemala: Facultad de Ciencias Jurídicas y Sociales, Universidad de San Carlos de Guatemala. Retrieved 2019-01-09.
ALMG. Comunidad Lingüística Ch'orti' (in Spanish). Jocotán, Guatemala: Academia de Lenguas Mayas de Guatemala. Retrieved 2019-01-04. Archived from the original on 2008-02-24.
Carpio Rezzio, Edgar H. (1999). Arqueología del extremo oriente de Guatemala y su relación fronteriza con Honduras y El Salvador (in Spanish). Estudios 37, pp. 2–15. (August 1999). Guatemala: Universidad de San Carlos de Guatemala: Instituto de Investigaciones Históricas, Antropológicas y Arqueológicas IIHAA. ISSN 0254-7724. . Retrieved 2019-01-04.
Castro Ramos, Xochitl Anaité (2003). "El Santo Ángel. Estudio antropológico sobre una santa popular guatemalteca: aldea El Trapiche, municipio de El Adelanto, departamento de Jutiapa" (in Spanish). Guatemala City, Guatemala: Escuela de Historia, Área de Antropología, Universidad de San Carlos de Guatemala. Retrieved 2019-01-09.
Dary Fuentes, Claudia (2008). Ethnic Identity, Community Organization and Social Experience in Eastern Guatemala: The Case of Santa María Xalapán (in Spanish). Albany, New York, US: ProQuest/College of Arts and Sciences, Department of Anthropology: University at Albany, State University of New York. . .
Franco Sandoval, Judith Adalgisa del Carmen (2003). Monografía de Chiquimula Educación y Cultura (in Spanish). Guatemala: Universidad de San Carlos de Guatemala: Facultad de Humanidades. Retrieved 2019-01-07.
González, Miguel; Gonzalo Hernández (2004). Mapa No. 4: Chiquimula: Popularmente conocida como la perla de oriente (PDF) (in Spanish). Guatemala: Prensa Libre. Retrieved 2019-01-03. Archived from the original on 2016-04-12.
INE (2002). Censos 2002: XI de Población y VI de Habitación (in Spanish). Guatemala: Instituto Nacional de Estadística INE. Retrieved 2019-01-04. Archived from the original on 2018-08-03.
INE (2014). Caracterización departamental Chiquimula 2013 (in Spanish). Guatemala: Instituto Nacional de Estadística INE. Retrieved 2019-01-04. Archived from the original on 2016-04-18.
Putzeys, Ivonne; Sheila Flores (2007). J.P. Laporte; B. Arroyo; H. Mejía, eds. "Excavaciones arqueológicas en la Iglesia de la Santísima Trinidad de Chiquimula de la Sierra: Rescate del nombre y el prestigio de una iglesia olvidada". XX Simposio de Arqueología en Guatemala, 2006 (in Spanish). Guatemala City, Guatemala: Museo Nacional de Arqueología y Etnología: 1473–1490. Archived from the original on 2011-09-14. Retrieved 2012-01-24.
SEGEPLAN (2001). Plan de desarollo departamental Chiquimula 2011–2025 (in Spanish). Guatemala: Secretaría de Planificación y Programación de la Presidencia SEGEPLAN. Retrieved 2019-01-03. Archived from the original on 2019-01-03.

 
Departments of Guatemala
1871 establishments in Guatemala